The Gold Coast and District Rugby Union, or GCDRU, is the local governing body for the sport of rugby union on Australia's Gold Coast. The GCRU runs a club rugby competition for men's teams with three senior grades, as well as a junior club competition that caters for teams grouped by age from under 6 to under 18 and Girls/Women's 7's on a Friday night.

Gold Coast representative teams play under the name "Cyclones" in a range of rugby competitions for senior and junior players. The Bond University Rugby Club plays in the Queensland Premier Rugby competition.

History
The foundation club for rugby union on the Gold Coast was the Gold Coast Eagles. The club was registered with the Queensland Rugby Union (QRU) after a positive response at the initial foundation meeting in late 1964.

The Gold Coast team's first season of rugby was in the 1965 Queensland Subbies competition, playing out of Rudd Park in Burleigh Heads. Coached by Paul Perrin and Bob Sinclair, the team went on to win the competition in 1965 and 1966, and finished second in 1967. In 1968, the QRU directed the Gold Coast to play in the Brisbane first grade competition. The team managed to defeat the eventual premiers GPS on their home ground but did not win any other matches for the season. This bad run of results and the logistics of traveling to Brisbane resulted in the Gold Coast team dropping out of all rugby competition in 1969. The club was reformed and rejoined Subbies in 1970.

In 1973, Col Macdonald and Barry Moon proposed the establishment of a second club on the Gold Coast, and the Surfers Paradise Dolphins club was founded in 1974. Coached by ex-Wallaby Alan Ware, the Surfers Paradise club played their first home games on the grounds of The Southport School.

In 1978 the Gold Coast and District Rugby Union affiliated with the Queensland Country Rugby Union.

Clubs
Bond University Rugby Club competes in Queensland Premier Rugby.

Gold Coast clubs that play in the GCDRU senior grade competitions, as of 2014, are:

Bond Pirates Rugby Club
Coolangatta Tweed Barbarians
Coomera Crushers RUC
Gold Coast Eagles
Griffith Uni Colleges Knights Rugby Union Club
Helensvale Hogs RUC
Hinterland Celtics Rugby Club
Nerang Bulls RUC
Palm Beach Currumbin Alleygators RUC
Surfers Paradise Dolphins

Additional clubs with junior teams that play in the Gold Coast age-group competitions include:
Beaudesert Warriors RUFC – also has a senior team in the Queensland Suburban Normanby Cup.
Casuarina Beach Rugby Club – junior club with links to Hinterland Celtics.
Tamborine Mountain Rugby Club
Yatala Rams Junior Rugby Union Club

Representative teams 

The GCDRU selects representative teams each year which play under the name "Cyclones". The senior men's team and junior age-group teams compete in the annual Queensland Country Championships.

See also

Rugby union in Queensland

References

Sources

External links

Archives

1964 establishments in Australia
Sports organizations established in 1964
Rugby union governing bodies in Queensland
Sport on the Gold Coast, Queensland